Neil Law (born 23 October 1974) is an English former rugby union, and professional rugby league footballer who played in the 1990s and 2000s.

Background
Law was born in Sheffield, West Yorkshire, England.

Rugby league career
Law played in the Super League for Sheffield Eagles in 1998, and the Wakefield Trinity Wildcats from 1999 until 2002, when he left the club by mutual consent.

Law joined the York City Knights in 2003, and scored 11 tries in 12 games before switching to rugby union. He returned to the York City Knights in 2005, scoring a further 25 tries in 44 appearances during the next two seasons. He returned to the Sheffield Eagles for one season in 2007, making nine appearances.

Genealogical Information
Neil Law is the brother of the rugby league footballer; Graham Law.

References

External links
Statistics at rugbyleagueproject.org
Cas in control as Wakefield wilt
Wakefield win to stay up
Wildcats are Giants' first victims
Wakefield hit by injuries
Villeneuve march on

1974 births
Living people
English rugby league players
English rugby union players
Northampton Saints players
Rugby league centres
Rugby league fullbacks
Rugby league players from Sheffield
Rugby league wingers
Rugby union players from Sheffield
Sheffield Eagles (1984) players
Sheffield Eagles players
Wakefield Trinity players
York City Knights players